The following is a list of  railroad companies that serve(d) Dallas. The first year is the year service began; the last is the year service was halted.

1872–1934 Houston and Texas Central Railroad (absorbed into the TNO)
1873–1976 Texas and Pacific Railway
1878–1880 Dallas and Wichita Railroad
1878 Dallas, Cleburne and Rio Grande Railroad
1878–1879 Chicago, Texas and Mexican Central Railway (purchased right of way from the DC&RG)
1879–1965 Gulf, Colorado and Santa Fe Railroad (acquired CT&MC)
1880–1989 Missouri-Kansas-Texas
1880–1881 Texas Trunk Railroad
1881–1961 Texas and New Orleans Railroad (acquired the TT)
1901–1904 Red River, Texas and Southern Railroad
1902–1964 Saint Louis, San Francisco and Texas Railroad (nickname Frisco, absorbed the RRT&S)
1903–1932 St. Louis Southwestern Railway
1903–1980 Chicago, Rock Island and Pacific Railroad
1925–1982 Fort Worth and Denver Railway
1932–1996 Southern Pacific (acquired the SLSW in 1932 and the T&NO in 1961)
1964–1980 St. Louis-San Francisco Railway (parent company merged with subsidiary)
1965–1996 Atchison, Topeka and Santa Fe (acquired the GC&SF)
1980–1996 Burlington Northern (acquired the SLSF and the bankrupt CRI&P lines in the Dallas area, merged the FW&D in 1982) 
1989–present Union Pacific (acquired the MKT in 1989, Southern Pacific in 1996)
1994–present Kansas City Southern Railroad (purchased right of way from AT&SF)
1996–present BNSF Railway (merger between BN and AT&SF)
 Trinity and Brazos Valley

See also 
 Former transit companies in Dallas, Texas
 List of defunct Texas railroads

Dallas
Dallas
Railroad companies
Rail transportation in Dallas
Dallas railroad companies
Dallas railroad companies